Transmigration is a science fiction book  by Scottish writer  J. T. McIntosh, published in 1970.

Plot summary
The hero discovers he is both cursed with bad luck and blessed with a miraculous power - the power to occupy other people's minds - provided he dies first.   A series of freak accidents bring him closer and closer to death, until at last he does die - but miraculously transmigrates into the nearest body around.   His power to occupy minds is involuntary, and when it happens, he overwhelms those he invades, though he is able to communicate with them.   Unwilling to depart from the bodies he occupies, he learns that the only way out of the body he is possessing is by dying, presenting him with an unusual ethical conflict.

See also
Anima (1972) by Marie Buchanan
Reincarnation in Venice by Max Ehrlich
The Reincarnation of Peter Proud by Max Ehrlich
Astral Projection
Out-of-body experience
List of science fiction novels

1970 British novels
1970 science fiction novels
Novels about reincarnation
British science fiction novels
Avon (publisher) books